Chaharbagh County is in Alborz province, Iran. The capital of the county is the city of Chaharbagh. At the 2006 census, the region's population (as Chaharbagh District of Savojbolagh County, Tehran province) was 61,135 in 15,380 households. At the 2016 census, the population of the district was 77,409 in 23,430 households, by which time Savojbolagh County had become a part of recently established Alborz province. Chaharbagh District was separated from the county on 16 December 2019 to become Chaharbagh County, with two districts: the Central District and Ramjin District.

Administrative divisions

The population history and structural changes of Chaharbagh County's administrative divisions (as a district of Savojbolagh County) over two censuses are shown in the following table.

References

Counties of Alborz Province

fa:شهرستان چهارباغ